VIVION Investments S.à r.l. is a real estate company based in Luxembourg. The company's portfolio includes hotels and office buildings in Germany and hotels in the United Kingdom. The market value of the portfolio is 2.9 billion euros.

History 
The group was founded in 2008, Vivion Holdings was founded in 2018 as Société à responsabilité limitée, in order to realign its orientation on the international capital market. The portfolio comprises around 100 properties, most of them office buildings and hotels.

Ownership structure 
The majority of the beneficial owners of Vivion Holdings are the Israeli entrepreneurial family Dayan and international institutional investors. Chief Executive Officer is Sascha Hettrich, Ella Raychman is CFO, and Bert Schröter is a director of the company. Amir Dayan, the Chairman of the Advisory Board of Vivion, is the main shareholder. Vivion's main partners are the Canadian pension fund Ivanhoe Cambridge and the Israeli funds Harel Insurance, Phoenix Insurance, Psagot Investment House and Bank Hapoalim.

Portfolio 
The company's management strategy is essentially based on the acquisition of properties in the UK, Germany and the Netherlands, with the company pursuing a buy-and-hold strategy.

Vivion owns over 50 hotels in Europe, mainly in the UK, operated mainly under the brand names Hilton, Holiday-Inn and Crowne Plaza.

In 2019, Vivion entered the capital market by raising €700 million in August and €300 million in October for UK and German property portfolios, with €4 billion in corporate bonds. The bond investors were leading international institutional investors. The investment houses JPMorgan Chase, Goldman Sachs and Citibank led the offering.

References

Real estate companies of Luxembourg